Ramiro Cortés (27 April 1931 – 9 November 2016) was a Chilean footballer. He played in 45 matches for the Chile national football team from 1952 to 1960. He was also part of Chile's squad for the 1956 South American Championship.

References

External links
 

1931 births
2016 deaths
Chilean footballers
Chile international footballers
Association football midfielders
Audax Italiano footballers
Unión Española footballers
Chilean Primera División players
People from La Serena